Sesame is a magazine for both students and alumni of the Open University (OU). It is published by the OU and circulated quarterly, and also has an online version.

Origins
Sesame magazine started publication in 1971, the Open University's inaugural year, when the first student cohort began their OU studies. It was designed to address the needs of students bringing them news, information and advice about distance learning at university level. Until the end of 2007, Sesame was published monthly.

Relaunch
The Summer 2008 edition announced the relaunch of Sesame, as follows: "Welcome to the first edition of the brand new Sesame! This is the beginning of something new from the OU as we have joined together to produce one magazine for our students and alumni. This magazine replaces Open Eye (the previous alumni magazine)."

References

Alumni magazines
Online magazines published in the United Kingdom
Magazines established in 1971
Open University
Monthly magazines published in the United Kingdom
Quarterly magazines published in the United Kingdom
Mass media in Buckinghamshire